United Football League may refer to:

United Football League (Philippines), an association football league in the Philippines
United Football League (1961–1964), an American football league which operated from 1961 to 1964
United Football League (2009–2012), an American football league which operated from 2009 to 2012

See also
United Indoor Football League
United States Football League
United League (disambiguation)